Stopford Peak is a peak,  high, on the east side of Hoseason Island and is the highest point on the island, in the Palmer Archipelago, near Antarctica. First roughly charted and named "Cape Stopford" by Henry Foster in 1829 for Admiral Sir Robert Stopford (1768–1847), Commander-in-Chief at Portsmouth, 1827–1830, where Foster's ship, the Chanticleer, fitted out for the voyage. The most prominent feature on the east side of Hoseason Island is this peak, which rises steeply from a straight piece of coast.

Mountains of the Palmer Archipelago